Middle Age Spread is a 1979 film adaptation of the Roger Hall play of the same name.

Plot
A deputy principal of a high school takes up jogging to combat a spreading waistline and gradually enters into an affair with a co-worker's wife when his wife loses interest in him.

Cast and characters
 Grant Tilly – Colin
 Donna Akersten – Judy
 Dorothy McKegg – Elizabeth
 Bridget Armstrong – Isobel
 Bevan Wilson – Robert
 Peter Sumner – Reg

References
New Zealand Film 1912–1996 by Helen Martin & Sam Edwards p. 69 (1997, Oxford University Press, Auckland)

External links
 
 
Middle Age Spread (1979) at New Zealand Feature Film Database

1970s New Zealand films
1995 films
New Zealand comedy films
1995 comedy films
New Zealand films based on plays
1990s English-language films
1970s English-language films